Government Dental College can refer to:

 Government Dental College, Amritsar
 Government Dental College, Bangalore
 Government Dental Hospital and College, Chennai
 Government Dental College, Mumbai
 Government Dental College, Patiala